Komon may refer to:

Leonard Patrick Komon (born 1988), Kenyan long-distance runner
Manga Mito Kōmon, Japanese anime television series
Mito Kōmon, Japanese jidaigeki or period drama
A form of Kimono